was a Japanese actress. Though best known for her performances in Yasujirō Ozu's films Late Spring (1949) and Tokyo Story (1953), she had already appeared in 67 films before working with Ozu.

Early career
Setsuko Hara was born  in what is now Hodogaya-ku, Yokohama in a family with three sons and five daughters. Her elder sister was married to film director Hisatora Kumagai, which gave her an entry into the world of the cinema: he encouraged her to drop out of school, which she did, and then she went to work for Nikkatsu Studios in Tamagawa, outside Tokyo, in 1935.

She came to prominence as an actress in the 1937 German-Japanese co-production Die Tochter des Samurai (The Daughter of the Samurai), known in Japan as Atarashiki Tsuchi (The New Earth), directed by Arnold Fanck and Mansaku Itami. In the film, Hara plays a woman who unsuccessfully attempts to immolate herself in a volcano. She continued to portray tragic heroines in many of her films until the end of World War II, like The Suicide Troops of the Watchtower (1942) and The Green Mountains (1949), directed by Tadashi Imai, and Toward the Decisive Battle in the Sky, directed by Kunio Watanabe.

Postwar career
Hara remained in Japan after 1945 and continued making films. She starred in Akira Kurosawa’s first postwar film, No Regrets for Our Youth (1946). She also worked with director Kimisaburo Yoshimura in A Ball at the Anjo House (1947) and Keisuke Kinoshita in Here’s to the Girls (1949). In all of these films, she was portrayed as the “new” Japanese woman, looking forward to a bright future. However, in most of her movies, especially those directed by Yasujirō Ozu and Mikio Naruse she plays the typical Japanese woman, as either daughter, wife, or mother.

Hara’s first film of six with Yasujirō Ozu was Late Spring (1949), and their collaboration would last for the next twelve years. In Late Spring, she plays Noriko, a devoted daughter who prefers to stay at home and take care of her father than to marry, despite the urgings of her family members. In Early Summer (1951), she played an unrelated character also called Noriko, who wanted to get married, and finds the courage to do so without her family’s approval. This was followed by Tokyo Story (1953), perhaps her and Ozu's best-known film, in which she played a widow, also called Noriko whose husband was killed in the war. Her devotion to her deceased husband worries her in-laws, who insist that she should move on and remarry.

Hara's last major role was Riku, the wife of Ōishi Yoshio, in the film Chushingura (1962).

Later years
Hara, who never married, is nicknamed "the Eternal Virgin" in Japan and is a symbol of the golden era of Japanese cinema of the 1950s. She quit acting in 1963 (the year Ozu died), and subsequently led a secluded life in Kamakura, where many of her films with Ozu were made, refusing all interviews and photographs. For years, people would speculate about her reasons for leaving the public eye. Hara herself confessed during her final press conference that she never really enjoyed acting and was only using it as a means to support her family; however, many people continued to speculate over her possible romantic involvement with Ozu, or the possibility of failing eyesight. Hara was an avid smoker and drinker.

After seeing a Setsuko Hara film, the novelist Shūsaku Endō wrote: "We would sigh or let out a great breath from the depths of our hearts, for what we felt was precisely this: Can it be possible that there is such a woman in this world?"

After more than half a century of seclusion, Hara died of pneumonia at a hospital in Kanagawa prefecture, on 5 September 2015, at the age of 95. Her death was not reported by the media until November 25 of that year due to her family only approaching them later (presumably for privacy). The anime film Millennium Actress (2001), directed by Satoshi Kon, is partly based on her life, although it was produced and released more than a decade prior to her death.

Legacy

Hara is considered by many critics and filmmakers to be the greatest Japanese actress of all time. Yasujiro Ozu, whom she worked with six times, said of her in 1951: "It is rare for an actress to perform as well as Setsuko Hara. She's a radish, without rather than revealing his own ignorance of the director not noticing the radish. In fact, without flattery, I think she's the best Japanese film actress." In his 1991 autobiography, Chishu Ryu described Hara as "not just beautiful, but also a skilled actress. She didn't make mistakes. Ozu rarely praised actors, ever. But he did say, "She's good.", which meant she was truly something."

In 2000, Hara was selected by celebrities as the greatest Japanese actress in Kinema Jumpo's list of the greatest 20th-century movie actors and actresses.

Selected filmography

Tamerau nakare wakodo yo (1935) - Osetsu
Shînya no taiyô (1935) - Kimie Oda
Midori no chiheisen zenpen (1935)
Midori no chiheisen kohen (1935)
Hakui no kajin (1936) - Yukiko
Kōchiyama Sōshun (1936) - Onami
Yomeiri mae no musume tachi (1936)
Seimei no kanmuri (1936) - Ayako Arimura
Tange sazen: Nikko no maki (1936)
Kenji to sono imôto (1937)
The Daughter of the Samurai (1937) - Misuko Yamato
Tôkai Bijoden (1937)
Haha no kyoku I (1937) - Keiko
Haha no kyoku II (1937) - Keiko
The Giant (1938) - Chiyo
Den'en kôkyôgaku (1938) - Yukiko
Shogun no magô (1938) - Kireii Nae Sasano
Fuyu no yado (1938)
Uruwashiki shuppatsu (1939) - Tomiko Hôjô
Chushingura (1939, part 1, 2) - Oteru
The Naval Brigade at Shanghai (1939) - young Chinese woman
Machi (1939) - Sonomi Kihara
Onna no kyôshitsu (1939, part 1, 2) - Chen Feng-ying
Tokyo no josei (1939) - Setsuko Kimizuka
Hikari to kage (1940, part 1, 2) - Sahoko Katsura
Toyuki (1940) - Showa Kinema actress
Totsugu hi made (1940) - Yoshiko
Hebihimesama (1940) - Koto Hime
Onna no machi (1940) - Ine
Futari no sekai (1940)
Shimai no Yakusoku (1940) - Sachiko
Anî no hânayomê (1941) - Akiko
Ôinaru kanô (1941)
Kêkkon no seitaî (1941) - Haruko Sanno
A Story of Leadership (1941) - eldest daughter
Kibô no aozora (1942) - Chizuko
Seishun no kiryû (1942) - Makiko, his sister
Wakai sensei (1942) - Tomiko Hirayama
Midori no daichi (1942) - Wife Hatsue
Haha no chizu (1942) - Kirie
Hawai Mare Oki Kaisen (The War at Sea from Hawaii to Malay) (1942) - Kikuko
Hawai · Maree oki kaisen (1942) - Kikuko
Ahen senso (aka The Opium War) (1943) - Airan [Ai Lan]
Bôrô no kesshitai (1943) - Yoshiko
Toward the Decisive Battle in the Sky (1943) - older sister
Searing Wind (1943) - Kumiko
Suicide Troops of the Watchtower (1943) - Commander Takazu's wife
Ikari no umi (1944) - Mitsuko Hiraga
Young Eagles (1944)
Shôri no hi made (1945)
Kita no san-nin (1945) - Sumiko Ueno
Koi no fuunjî (1945) - Yukiko Hasebe
Midori no kokkyô (1946) - Maki Kuriyama
Reijin (1946) - Keiko
No Regrets for Our Youth (1946) - Yukie Yagihara
Kakedashi jidai (1947) - Miyako Tomoda
A Ball at the Anjo House (1947) - Atsuko Anjô
Onnadake no yoru (1947)
Sanbon yubi no otoko (1947) - Shizuko
Yuwaku (1948) - Takako
Toki no teizo: zengohen (1948)
Fujisancho (1948)
Taifuken no onna (1948) - Kuriko Sato
Kofuku no genkai (1948)
President and a female clerk (1948) - Shop girl
Tonosama Hotel (1949) - Aki Nagaoka
Ojôsan kanpai (Here's to the Young Lady) (1949) - Yasuko Ikeda
Aoi sanmyaku (1949) - Yukiko Shimazaki
Zoku aoi sanmyaku (1949) - Yukiko Shimazaki
Late Spring (1949, directed by Ozu) - Noriko Somiya
Shirayuki-sensei to kodomo-tachi (1950) - Kayoko Amamiya
Arupisu monogatari: Yasei (1950)
Nanairo no hana (1950) - Teruko Kashiwagi
Joi no Shinsatsushitsu (1950) - Dr. Tajima
The Idiot (1951) - Taeko Nasu
Early Summer (1951, directed by Ozu) - Noriko Mamiya
Repast (1951) - Michiyo Okamoto
Kaze futatabi (1952)
Kin no tamago: Golden girl (1952)
Tôkyô no koibito (1952) - Yuki
Shirauo (1953) - Sachiko
Tokyo Story (1953, directed by Ozu) - Noriko Hirayama
Sound of the Mountain (1954) - Ogata Kikuko
Non-chan Kumo ni Noru (1955) - Nobuko's mother
Uruwashiki haha (1955) - Mitsuyo Ôta
Shūu (1956) - Fumiko
Aijô no kessan (1956) - Katsuko
Kon'yaku sanbagarasu (1956)
Jôshû to tomo ni (1956) - Sugiyama, manager
Ani to sono musume (1956) - Akiko Mamiya
Ōban (1957) - Kanako Mori
Tokyo Twilight (1957, directed by Ozu) - Takako Numata
Chieko-sho (1957) - Chieko Takamura
Zoku Ôban: Fûun hen (1957) - Kanako Arishima
Saigo no dasso (1957) - Tomiko
Zokuzoku Ôban: Dotô hen (1957) - Kanako Arishima
Onna de aru koto (1958) - Ichiko
A Holiday in Tokyo (1958) - Chairman
Oban kanketsu hen (1958)
Onna gokoro (1959) - Isoko
The Three Treasures (1959) - Amaterasu, the Sun Goddess
Robo no ishi (1960) - Oren Aikawa
Daughters, Wives and a Mother (1960) - Sanae Sakanoshi, the eldest daughter
Fundoshi isha (1960) - Iku, Wife of Keisai
Late Autumn (1960, directed by Ozu) - Akiko Miwa
The End of Summer (1961, directed by Ozu) - Akiko
Musume to watashi (1962) - Chizuko Iwatani
Chushingura (1962) - Riku (final film role)

References
Karlsson, Mats. 'Setsuko Hara: Japan's Eternal Virgin and Reluctant Star of the Silver Screen.' In Stars in World Cinema: Screen Icons and Star Systems Across Cultures, ed. Andrea Bandhauer and Michelle Royer, pp. 51–63. I.B. Tauris. (2015) 
Weston, Mark. Giants of Japan: The Lives of Japan's Greatest Men and Women. Kodansha International. (2002) 
Yoshimoto, Mitsuhiro. Kurosawa: Film Studies and Japanese Cinema. Duke University Press. (2000)

Notes

External links

JMDb Profile (in Japanese)
Setsuko Hara at Ozu-san.com

1920 births
2015 deaths
20th-century Japanese actresses
Deaths from pneumonia in Japan
Japanese film actresses
People from Yokohama